Deh Now-e Do (also known as Deh-e Now and Dehnow) is a village in Kuh Panj Rural District, in the Central District of Bardsir County, Kerman Province, Iran. At the 2006 census, its population was 41, in 7 families.

References 

Populated places in Bardsir County